The Comité Consultatif National d'Ethique is a French governmental advisory council on bioethics issues. It was created by a presidential decree of François Mitterrand in 1983.

See also 
 National Commission for the Protection of Human Subjects of Biomedical and Behavioral Research (U.S. 1974-1978)
 President's Commission for the Study of Ethical Problems in Medicine and Biomedical and Behavioral Research (U.S. 1978-1983)
 National Bioethics Advisory Commission (U.S. 1996–2001)
 The President's Council on Bioethics (U.S. 2001-2009)

References

Bioethics
Politics of France
Government agencies of France
Science and technology in France